Joseph Azzopardi (born 8 April 1955 in Senglea) was the Chief Justice of Malta from 2018 till his retirement on 8 April 2020.

Biography 
Graduate as Notary Public from the University of Malta in 1978 and as Doctor of Laws in 1979, Azzopardi was the first president of the Federation of Maltese Youth Organizations in 1980.

Since 1980 Azzopardi practiced as a private lawyer for 23 years, specialising mainly in Civil Law and Matrimonial Law, and consulting for among others Lohombus Corporation and the Malta Public Transport Authority. He was appointed director of the then Mid Med Bank from 1981 to 1987, and was a member of the Housing Authority Board from 1997 to 2003. He also served as a Commissioner of Justice from 1997 to 2003 and was Chairman of various disciplinary Boards including those at Maltacom and the Malta Freeport Corporation. Azzopardi served as a member of the Committee of the Chamber of Advocates from 1996 to 2000 and was then elected its President until 2003. As such, he was ex officio member of the Commission for the Administration of Justice of Malta. 

On 23 May 2003, Azzopardi was appointed by Prime Minister Eddie Fenech Adami (PN) as Judge of the Superior Courts. He presided the Family Section of the Civil Courts. 
In April 2018, at 63, Azzopardi was appointed by Prime Minister Joseph Muscat (PL) as Chief Justice of Malta.  He was considered an uncontroversial choice. He is expect to retire at 65 in 2020.

Azzopardi has also served as examiner in Civil Law in the Faculty of Laws of the University of Malta. He also once unsuccessfully contested a single general election as a Labour candidate. 

In October 2019, he used the occasion of the annual speech to lash out against journalists for asking compromising questions, saying that "it is easy to attack members of the judiciary because you know they can’t answer you".

He is married and has a daughter.

See also
 List of Chief Justices of Malta

References 

Living people
Chief justices of Malta
1955 births
Place of birth missing (living people)
20th-century Maltese people
21st-century Maltese people
20th-century judges
21st-century judges